"Eyes of a Stranger" is a song by progressive metal band Queensrÿche appearing on their 1988 album Operation: Mindcrime. It is the last song on Operation Mindcrime, summarizing the story in the album. It has also been featured on two of their compilations, Greatest Hits and Sign of the Times: The Best of Queensrÿche. It was the band's first single to chart on the US Mainstream Rock chart, where it reached number 35.

Known as a fan favorite, the group has played the song often live, doing so over a thousand times as of April 2016, and the track is the band's number one most played song in its setlist history.

Critical reception
Members of the Scottish pop band Win reviewed the song for the May 13, 1989 issue of British music newspaper Record Mirror. Emmanuel Shoniwa and Davy Henderson both found the beginning intro of the track "seriously good" and even "brilliant". But continuation of it brought disappointment to them. Shoniwa supposed that Queensrÿche simply "frightened themselves" and Henderson said that the band were faced with an identity crisis.

Track listing

Charts

Personnel
Geoff Tate – lead vocals, keyboards
Chris DeGarmo – lead guitar
Michael Wilton – rhythm guitar
Eddie Jackson – bass
Scott Rockenfield – drums

References

External links
Official Music Video on YouTube

1988 singles
1988 songs
EMI Records singles
Queensrÿche songs
Song recordings produced by Peter Collins (record producer)
Songs written by Chris DeGarmo
Songs written by Geoff Tate